Sri Krishnanjaneya Yuddham is a 1972 Indian Telugu-language Hindu mythological film, produced by D. N. Raju and directed by C. S. Rao. It stars N. T. Rama Rao, Devika, Vanisri, S.V. Ranga Rao and Rajanala, with music composed by T. V. Raju.

Plot 
The film is based on Hindu mythology which shows Lord Anjaneya's devotion to Lord Rama. Rama is brokenhearted as he is inept to take separating Seeta as she returned to her mother Bhudevi. So, Anjaneya approaches Vasishta stating that he endures any pain for his lord. Consequently, Yama appears in a form of a priest declaring the fulfillment of Ramavatar is completed and asking him to back to Vaikuntha. However, Rama is still bounded to Anjaneya when Yama facilitates their spilt by ostracizing Anjaneya from Ayodhya. Following, Rama merges into Vishnu and Anjaneya lands at Gandhah Madava mountain.

Eras roll by, Dwaparayuga arrives, and Rama takes incarnation as Krishna. As of now, Balarama opposes his brother’s charities and obstructs his opportunity to see him without his permission. Besides, vainglory Satyabhama always trashes Seeta's character in the Ramayana, and after grounds Narakasura, her arrogance summits. Meanwhile, Garutmantha, the vehicle of Vishnu, is in hunt of his daily prey Nagakanya. Whereat, Narada guides her to reach Krishna who ushers her to Anjaneya. Forthwith, he shelters her when Garudmantha onslaughts who reforms after baffled him.

Next, to edify Balarama & Satyabhama Sage Narada drives a game with Krishna’s blessings to comprehend his real form. Once Anjaneya spots and seizes Yama for the whereabouts of his Lord when Narada replies Rama's Avatar is time immemorial and in current time the Lord is Krishna. Angered, Anjaneya proclaims just one God in the universe that is Rama. Here, Narada exaggerates that his chants Rama might consider Balarama, brother of Krishna. Being cognizant of it, Anjaneya consigns an ordinance to alter Balarama’s title. Hence, infuriated Balarama assaults who is thwarted and backs with soul-searching.

On the spot, exasperated Anjaneya attacks Dwaraka in the quest for Krishna. At that point, to cool him Narada requests Krishna to attire as Rama when he affirms Seeta is vital for it. As of now, Satyabhama is disguised as so, but Anjaneya repudiates and boots her. Ergo, Narada instructs her to plead with Rukmini which is impeded by her pride. Anyhow, she does so after witnessing Krishna's anger. The war begins between Krishna & Anjaneya, which leads to catastrophe. Then, Rukmini sheds light on Anjaneya that Rama & Krishna is one sole. At last, the illusion that occurred to Anjaneya is removed, identifies Krishna as his lord, and begs pardon. Finally, the movie ends with Anjaneya chanting Krishna.

Cast 

N. T. Rama Rao as Lord Krishna
Devika as Rukmini
Vanisri as  Sathyabhama
S. V. Ranga Rao as Balarama
Kanta Rao as Narada Maharshi
Rajanala as Lord Hanuman
Raja Babu as Vasanthaka
V. Nagayya as Sandipani
Dhulipala as Yama Dharma Raju
Mikkilineni as Vasudeva
Mukkamala as Durvasa
Arjan Janardhan Rao as Garukmanthudu
Tyagaraju as Narakasura
Santha Kumari as Yashoda
Hemalatha as Devaki
Roja Ramani
Sandhya Rani
Leela Rani
Vijaya Bhanu
Y. Vijaya

Soundtrack 
Music composed by T. V. Raju.

References

External links 
 

1972 films
Films based on the Mahabharata
Films scored by T. V. Raju
Hindu mythological films
Films directed by C. S. Rao